A Cry from Within is a 2015 American horror film directed by Deborah Twiss and Zach Miller and starring Twiss, Eric Roberts, Cathy Moriarty and James McCaffrey.

Cast
Deborah Twiss as Cecile
Eric Roberts as Jonathan
Cathy Moriarty as Alice
James McCaffrey
Pat Patterson as Sophia

Release
The film was released on DVD and VOD on March 17, 2015.

Reception
Matt Boiselle of Dread Central awarded the film two and a half stars out of five.

References

External links
 

American horror films
2015 films
2015 horror films
2010s English-language films
2010s American films